Adam Sedlák (born 21 September 1991) is a Czech ice hockey defenceman currently playing for Orli Znojmo of the 2nd Czech Republic Hockey League

He joined Znojmo from HC '05 Banská Bystrica of the Slovak Tipsport liga.

References

External links
 

1991 births
Asiago Hockey 1935 players
HC '05 Banská Bystrica players
Czech ice hockey defencemen
Ducs de Dijon players
HC Vítkovice players
Knoxville Ice Bears (SPHL) players
Living people
Orli Znojmo players
Ottawa 67's players
Peterborough Petes (ice hockey) players
SønderjyskE Ishockey players
Sportspeople from Ostrava
Czech expatriate ice hockey players in Canada
Czech expatriate ice hockey players in the United States
Czech expatriate ice hockey players in Slovakia
Czech expatriate sportspeople in France
Czech expatriate sportspeople in Italy
Czech expatriate sportspeople in Denmark
Expatriate ice hockey players in France
Expatriate ice hockey players in Italy
Expatriate ice hockey players in Denmark